Phoebe Claire Graham (born 23 October 1991) is an English cricketer who currently plays for Lancashire, North West Thunder and Manchester Originals. She plays as a right-arm medium bowler. She has previously played for Nottinghamshire, Devon, Berkshire, Yorkshire, North Representative XI, Northern Diamonds, Northern Superchargers and Northern Districts.

Early life
Graham was born on 23 October 1991 in Steeton, West Yorkshire. She attended Exeter University, and has worked in marketing. Her father, Peter, played cricket for Northumberland.

Domestic career
Graham made her county debut in 2010, for Nottinghamshire against Sussex. She did not bowl and was out for a duck. She only played one more match for Nottinghamshire, however, and played the rest of the season for Yorkshire. She took five wickets at an average of 19.40 for the side in that season's Twenty20 Cup, and continued to be a regular until she moved to Devon ahead of the 2014 season.

Graham only remained at Devon for two seasons, and took a break from the game after her father died in 2015. She was "dragged back" to cricket after watching the 2017 World Cup Final, and subsequently began playing for Berkshire for the 2018 season. She had a successful return, especially in the 2018 Women's Twenty20 Cup, where she took 9 wickets at an average of 10.22. She continued this form into 2019, taking 12 wickets at an average of 18.66 in the County Championship. Ahead of the 2021 season, Graham returned to Yorkshire, and was subsequently named as part of the team's contingent in the North Representative XI squad for the Twenty20 Cup, and took two wickets in four matches for the side. In 2022, Graham joined Lancashire. She was the side's joint-leading wicket-taker in the 2022 Women's Twenty20 Cup, with 13 wickets at an average of 10.00.

In 2020, Graham played for the Northern Diamonds in the Rachael Heyhoe Flint Trophy. The team reached the final of the tournament, and whilst Graham only took two wickets in her five matches, her new ball bowling was described as "crucial", and she had an economy of just 3.87. In 2021, Graham took six wickets in the Rachael Heyhoe Flint Trophy and four wickets in the Charlotte Edwards Cup, helping her side reach the final of both competitions. She also played for Northern Superchargers in The Hundred, appearing in four matches. At the end of the season it was announced that Graham had moved to North West Thunder, and signed a professional contract with her new side. She played eleven matches for her new side, across the Charlotte Edwards Cup and the Rachael Heyhoe Flint Trophy, taking six wickets. She also moved to Manchester Originals in The Hundred, playing two matches and taking one wicket.

In December 2022, it was announced that Graham had signed for Northern Districts as an overseas player to play in the 2022–23 Super Smash. She played eight matches for the side in the tournament, taking seven wickets at an average of 21.00.

Graham also played in the 2011 and 2012 Super Fours.

References

External links
 
 

1991 births
Living people
Sportspeople from West Yorkshire
Nottinghamshire women cricketers
Yorkshire women cricketers
Devon women cricketers
Berkshire women cricketers
North Representative XI cricketers
Lancashire women cricketers
Northern Diamonds cricketers
North West Thunder cricketers
Northern Superchargers cricketers
Manchester Originals cricketers
Northern Districts women cricketers